Bole Mosque is located in the center of Bole in the West Gonja District which is now in the Savannah region, formally Northern region in Ghana.

History 
It is claimed to have been built in the 17th century. Other historical events suggested it was rebuilt in the early 20th century It is also claimed in the oral traditions that it was constructed in the 18th century. The state of the Gonjas was claimed to have emerges in the mid 16th century which is in the Savannah region. It extends to the tropical forest to the north in current Ghana. Oral tradition claims its origin went back to the arrivals of the Mande conquerors who originated from the area of Djenne because of the gold trade and took control of it.

Features 
It is made of mud in a Sudanic architectural style of Sudano-Sahelian architecture with sticks and mud. It also has wooden poles found between the buttresses but do not function as structural support to the building. They are used as scaffolding for maintaining the painting and plaster at times. It has short towers.

References 

Mosques in Ghana
Savannah Region (Ghana)
17th-century mosques
Sudano-Sahelian architecture